Leon Heinschke (born 8 November 1999) is a German cyclist, who currently rides for UCI WorldTeam .

Major results

2016
 1st Stage 1a (TTT) La Coupe du Président de la Ville de Grudziądz
2017
 1st  Time trial, National Junior Road Championships
 2nd Overall Giro della Lunigiana
1st Points classification
 3rd Overall Tour du Pays de Vaud
 5th Overall GP Général Patton
1st Mountains classification
1st Stage 2
 10th Overall Course de la Paix Juniors
2019
 1st  Road race, National Under-23 Road Championships
2020
 1st Stage 2b (TTT) Ronde de l'Isard
 7th Poreč Trophy
2021
 2nd Overall Circuit des Ardennes International
1st Points classification
1st Young rider classification
 3rd Overall Tour Alsace
1st  Young rider classification

References

External links

1999 births
Living people
German male cyclists
Sportspeople from Frankfurt (Oder)
Cyclists from Brandenburg